Big Hopes is the third studio album by American country music artist Ty Herndon. It features the singles "A Man Holding On (To a Woman Lettin' Go)", "It Must Be Love", and "Hands of a Working Man". These songs peaked at #5, #1, and #5, respectively, on the Billboard Hot Country Singles & Tracks (now Hot Country Songs) charts. "It Must Be Love" was his third and final Number One on the country charts, while "Hands of a Working Man" was his last Top Ten.

Doug Virden and Drew Womack, then members of Sons of the Desert, serve as backing vocalists on other tracks, as they did on Herndon's previous album Living in a Moment. Blue Miller, formerly of Bob Seger's Silver Bullet Band and later of the Gibson/Miller Band, also provides background vocals.

Thom Owens of Allmusic rated the album three stars out of five, saying that it "comes as close to MOR rock and pop as it does to country."

Track listing

Personnel
Compiled from liner notes.

Byron Gallimore-produced tracks (1, 3-7)
Larry Byrom – electric guitar
Steven Conn – accordion
Dan Dugmore – steel guitar
Sonny Garrish – steel guitar
Aubrey Haynie – fiddle
Ty Herndon – lead vocals
Jeff King – acoustic guitar
B. James Lowry – acoustic guitar
Brent Mason – electric guitar
Terry McMillan – percussion
Steve Nathan – keyboards
Tom Roady – percussion
D. Vincent Williams – background vocals
Lonnie Wilson – drums
Glenn Worf – bass guitar
Curtis Wright – background vocals
Curtis Young – background vocals

Doug Johnson-produced tracks (2, 8-11)
Joe Chemay – bass guitar
Larry Franklin – fiddle
Paul Franklin – steel guitar
Steve Gibson – electric guitar
Ty Herndon – lead vocals
John Hobbs – keyboards
Dann Huff – electric guitar
Mike Jones – background vocals
Paul Leim – drums
Patty Loveless – background vocals
Blue Miller – background vocals
Wendell Mobley – background vocals
Steve Nathan – keyboards
Tom Roady – percussion
Brent Rowan – electric guitar
Doug Virden – background vocals
Biff Watson – acoustic guitar
Drew Womack – background vocals

Chart performance

Weekly charts

Year-end charts

References

1998 albums
Epic Records albums
Ty Herndon albums
Albums produced by Byron Gallimore
Albums produced by Doug Johnson (record producer)